The Omanawa River is a river of the Bay of Plenty Region of New Zealand's North Island.

The New Zealand Ministry for Culture and Heritage gives a translation of "place of Manawa" for Ōmanawa.

At the base of the falls is a large deep pool approximately 100 metres in diameter. At the back and under the lip of the falls, the river has hollowed out a huge cavern. To one side of the falls is the Omanawa Falls Power Station which is powered by water diverted around the falls.

See also
List of rivers of New Zealand

References

Rivers of the Bay of Plenty Region
Rivers of New Zealand